Éric Sabin (born 22 August 1975 in Sarcelles, Val-d'Oise) is a French former professional footballer, who last played for Nîmes Olympique and Martinique.

Club career
Sabin started his professional career at Nîmes Olympique and has played for several English clubs, Swindon Town, QPR (where he scored once against Grimsby), Boston United, Northampton Town and Oxford United. He also played for some other lower league outfits in France.

International career
Sabin played 3 games for Martinique at the 2008 Caribbean Cup, scoring 4 goals.

References

External links
  
  
 
 
 

1974 births
Living people
People from Sarcelles
French footballers
Martiniquais footballers
French people of Martiniquais descent
Association football forwards
AC Arlésien players
Nîmes Olympique players
Swindon Town F.C. players
Queens Park Rangers F.C. players
Boston United F.C. players
Northampton Town F.C. players
Oxford United F.C. players
Expatriate footballers in England
Martinique international footballers
Footballers from Val-d'Oise
Wasquehal Football players